Robert Gordon Greenhill, (born 1962) is a Canadian businessman, civil servant and expert on international development.

Career
In May 2005 Greenhill was appointed president of the Canadian International Development Agency (CIDA), and Deputy Minister for International Cooperation during the 27th Canadian Ministry. Greenhill oversaw changes to CIDA's programming. Food aid was 100% untied by April 2008. Greenhill was also engaged in Haiti, unveiling a 5-year $520 million commitment in 2006.

United Nations Secretary-General Kofi Annan named Greenhill to the High-level Panel on United Nations Systemwide Coherence. The panel's final report Delivering as One outlined strategies for greater management coherence and effectiveness in UN efforts in the areas of the environment, development and humanitarian assistance. Greenhill also helped draft recommendations that led to the creation of UN Women. His contribution was "commended" by Canadian women's groups.

Greenhill began his career at McKinsey & Company before joining Bombardier Inc. in 1995. In 2001, he became president of Bombardier's International Group. In 2004, Greenhill joined the International Development Research Centre as Senior Visiting Executive, producing a critical account of Canada's global engagement "Making A Difference?". Greenhill's study was seen as evidence that Canada was playing only "a marginal role in international affairs."

In 2008, Greenhill joined the Geneva-based World Economic Forum as managing director. Greenhill engaged with key global business leaders on how to improve the role of business in society.

In 2014, Greenhill returned to Montreal to found Global Canada, a multistakeholder initiative committed to improving Canada's global impact. In September 2015 Greenhill co-authored "Assessing Canada's Global Engagement Gap". The report focused attention on Canada's international role during the 2015 Federal election, pointing out that in "defence and development spending, Canada has done poorly compared with its G7 partners".

Education
Greenhill has a BA in political science from the University of Alberta (1984), where he was twice Student Union president. He has an MA in international history from the London School of Economics (1986), and an MBA from INSEAD (1987).

References

External links
Brief bio at the World Economic Forum
Globe and Mail "Refugee crisis: Canada's opportunity for global leadership"
National Post "Our real humanitarian record in Afghanistan"

1962 births
Living people
Businesspeople from Alberta
McKinsey & Company people
University of Alberta alumni
Alumni of the London School of Economics
INSEAD alumni
Canadian civil servants